Beskidian Foothills or Beskidian Piedmont may refer to:

 West Beskidian Foothills, a foothill region, adjacent to the Western Beskids
 Central Beskidian Foothills, a foothill region, adjacent to the Central Beskids
 Beskidian Southern Foothills, a foothill region of the Central Beskids

See also 
 Central Beskids (disambiguation)
 Eastern Beskids (disambiguation)
 Beskid (disambiguation)